The Outsider is an American psychological thriller-horror crime drama television series based on the 2018 novel of the same name by Stephen King, adapted for television by Richard Price. It was ordered to series on December 3, 2018, after being optioned as a miniseries by MRC in June 2018. It premiered on HBO on January 12, 2020. It stars Ben Mendelsohn, Cynthia Erivo, Bill Camp, Paddy Considine, Julianne Nicholson, and Jason Bateman (who also directed the first two episodes).

In November 2020, HBO passed on a second season with production company MRC to shop the series to other outlets. King stated that scripts for a second season were written, and the cast and crew expressed interest in continuing the series.

Cast

Main

Ben Mendelsohn as Ralph Anderson, a detective in the Cherokee City police department. Ralph is a recovering alcoholic struggling to cope with the loss of his son, Derek, who died of cancer years before the show's events, and has a jaded and skeptical attitude towards the cases he investigates.
Jason Bateman as Terry Maitland, a Little League baseball coach who is arrested for the murder of a young boy, Frankie Peterson.
Bill Camp as Howie Salomon, the Maitlands' trusted lawyer, who comes at odds with Ralph over the investigation before assisting on the case.
Jeremy Bobb as Alec Pelley, Howard's partner at his firm who refers the detectives to Holly Gibney.
Julianne Nicholson as Glory Maitland, Terry's wife, who struggles to raise her children amidst the stigma placed on her family after her husband's arrest.
Mare Winningham as Jeannie Anderson, Ralph's wife and a caseworker who befriends Glory and helps Ralph uncover the true scope of the case.
Paddy Considine as Claude Bolton, an employee at the Peach Crease, a local bar and strip club. Claude is an ex-convict and recovering addict who is initially interviewed as a witness in the Maitland investigation before becoming more entangled in the case himself.
Yul Vazquez as Yunis Sablo, a GBI lieutenant who works on the case with Ralph and as a practicing catholic is more open to believing in paranormal events.
Marc Menchaca as Jack Hoskins, a hard-nosed, alcoholic police detective and former veteran who pushes himself into the Maitland case.
Cynthia Erivo as Holly Gibney, a private detective with savant-like memory and perceptive capabilities who is called in to consult on the Maitland investigation.

Recurring

Production
The series was announced in June 2018, with Richard Price hired to adapt the Stephen King novel. HBO officially commissioned the series in December, with Ben Mendelsohn cast in the lead while serving as a producer. Jason Bateman executive produces and also stars in the series.

In January 2019, the core main cast was set, seeing the additions of Cynthia Erivo, Bill Camp, Mare Winningham, Paddy Considine, Julianne Nicholson, Yul Vazquez, Jeremy Bobb and Marc Menchaca. Hettienne Park and Michael Esper appear in recurring roles.

Richard Price took considerable liberties in adapting the novel to television. In the series, Ralph Anderson is grieving the death of his son, who is alive in the book. "I needed Ralph to have more of a personal stake in the loss of children," Price told Variety. The pace of the series is also considerably different; the first two episodes cover the first half of the novel, while the remaining eight episodes cover the second half.

Episodes

Notes

Related series
The character of Holly Gibney was first introduced by King in the Bill Hodges trilogy of novels. That trilogy has been adapted into the TV series Mr. Mercedes, which premiered on Audience in 2017 with Justine Lupe as Gibney. Showrunner Richard Price reworked the character to some extent, without keeping the continuity with the Mr. Mercedes TV series or Bill Hodges novels (Price did not watch the series or read the novels) and asked Stephen King to rename the character, but King insisted on keeping the name Holly Gibney.

Reception

Critical response
On Rotten Tomatoes, the series has a 91% rating with an average score of 7.7 out of 10 based on 77 reviews. The site's critical consensus is, "Though The Outsiders slow burn isn't always satisfying, it remains watchable thanks to its excellent performances – especially series stand out Cynthia Erivo." On Metacritic, it has a score of 68 out of 100 based on 29 reviews, indicating "generally favorable reviews".

The first two episodes of the series were critically acclaimed, with particular praise for its atmosphere, Bateman's direction, and the performances of the cast. Reception was less positive for the remainder of the series, with continued praise for the cast (particularly Erivo and Mendelsohn) but criticism directed towards the series' pace, length, and handling of the supernatural elements of the source material. Taylor Antrim of Vogue called the first two hours "thrilling [and] totally frightening", praising Mendelsohn's "magnificent" performance and the "unrelentingly dark, irresistibly tense" atmosphere. Remarking on the later episodes, Antrim stated, "Surely enough, this series, which begins at a roiling boil, slows to a tight simmer. There is talk of doppelgängers, a demonic man in a hoodie, malevolent spirits that feed on grief. As The Outsider lazes into such horror tropes, the series loses some of its early charge." Sophie Gilbert of The Atlantic felt that the series worked better as an "elegantly bleak procedural," citing writer Price's inexperience with the horror genre as the reason why "the minute the series has to contend with inexplicable phenomena, it unravels." Still, Gilbert called the first two episodes "superb," praising Bateman's "strikingly effective" performance and direction and also singling out Mendelsohn and Nicholson for praise.

Mike Hale of the New York Times credited writer Price with keeping the series's mystery "legible and credible" and named Erivo's performance as Holly Gibney the best part of the series. That said, Hale found that the series often struggled to adapt its source material, and also criticized the slow pace. Jen Chaney of Vulture noted that the series struggled to balance its tone between "a relatively standard, well-executed crime drama" and "more supernatural, King-style territory." Chaney praised the "welcome understatement" of Erivo's performance and called Mendelsohn "superb" but criticized the series for introducing too many additional subplots and losing its narrative focus. Chaney summarized, "It feels like Price had a firm grip on this story at first but, as he added to it, it started to slip through his fingers like wet clay whipping around on a pottery wheel without firm hands to shape it."

Ratings

Accolades

Home media
The 10-episode limited series was released on Blu-ray and DVD in the United States on July 28, 2020, and features over 40 minutes of  behind-the-scenes content.

References

External links

2020s American drama television miniseries
2020s American crime drama television series
2020s American horror television series
2020 American television series debuts
2020 American television series endings
American horror fiction television series
American thriller television series
English-language television shows
HBO original programming
Horror drama television series
Horror fiction television series
Television shows based on works by Stephen King
Television series created by Richard Price (writer)
Television series by Media Rights Capital
Television shows set in Georgia (U.S. state)